Edgar C. Gadbois (born c.1936) is an American politician who served as Mayor of Marlborough, Massachusetts.

References

Mayors of Marlborough, Massachusetts
Year of birth missing
Possibly living people